One Cool Group Limited, is a Hong Kong company founded by actor and film producer Louis Koo in 2013. One Cool Group engages films business such as financing, production, post-production, distribution and promotion, as well as artist management business and film equipment rental services.

Scopes of operation

Filmography
The films produced by the company under One Cool Films and/or One Cool CMC and distributed by One Cool Pictures

References

External links
Official website

Hong Kong film studios
Film production companies of Hong Kong
Companies established in 2013